The 1948 Commonwealth Prime Ministers' Conference was the third Meeting of the Heads of Government of the British Commonwealth. It was held in the United Kingdom in October 1948, and was hosted by that country's Prime Minister, Clement Attlee.

It was the first such meeting to be attended by prime ministers of recently independent Asian states: Ceylon, India and Pakistan. The growth in membership ended the previous 'intimacy' of the meeting. The issue of whether countries, specifically India, could remain Commonwealth members if they became republics was raised but was not resolved until the next conference in 1949.

Ireland was initially invited to attend the Conference. After Ireland announced the pending repeal of its last connection to the British king, this invitation was revoked. This was so even though at the time the British Commonwealth still regarded Ireland as one of its members. Ireland had not participated in any equivalent conferences since 1932. It had announced plans to adopt legislation severing all ties with the British crown, although at the time of the Conference, it had not yet brought that legislation into force. Irish Minister for External Affairs Seán MacBride and Minister for Finance Patrick McGilligan attended one day of the conference as observers.

The Final Communique issued by the leaders at the conclusion of the meeting saw a change in nomenclature. The terms 'Dominion' and 'Dominion Government' were superseded by 'Commonwealth country' and 'Commonwealth Government'. 'British' was omitted in front of 'Commonwealth of Nations' for the first time in the Communique.

Participants

References

1948
Diplomatic conferences in the United Kingdom
20th-century diplomatic conferences
1948 in international relations
1948 in London
United Kingdom and the Commonwealth of Nations
1948 conferences
October 1948 events in the United Kingdom
Clement Attlee
William Lyon Mackenzie King
Jawaharlal Nehru
Liaquat Ali Khan